The 4th Siberian Rifle Division was an infantry formation of the Russian Imperial Army. It was demobilized in 1918.

Organization
1st Brigade
13th Siberian Rifle Regiment
14th Siberian Rifle Regiment
2nd Brigade
15th Siberian Rifle Regiment
16th Siberian Rifle Regiment
4th Siberian Rifle Artillery Brigade

Commanders (Division Chiefs) 
1905: lieutenant general Alexander Fok
1909: lieutenant general Nikolai Krauze

References

Infantry divisions of the Russian Empire
Military units and formations established in 1906
Military units and formations disestablished in 1918
1906 establishments in the Russian Empire